Ernest Borgnine (born Ermes Effron Borgnino; January 24, 1917 – July 8, 2012) was an American actor whose career spanned over six decades. He was noted for his gruff but relaxed voice and gap-toothed Cheshire Cat grin. A popular performer, he also appeared as a guest on numerous talk shows and as a panelist on several game shows.

Borgnine's film career began in 1951 and included supporting roles in China Corsair (1951), From Here to Eternity (1953), Vera Cruz (1954), Bad Day at Black Rock (1955), and The Wild Bunch (1969). He also played the unconventional lead in many films, winning the Academy Award for Best Actor in 1956, for Marty (1955), which also won the 1956 Academy Award for Best Picture. Borgnine achieved continuing success in the sitcom McHale's Navy (1962–1966), in which he played the title character, and co-starred as Dominic Santini in the action series Airwolf (1984–1986), in addition to a wide variety of other roles.

Borgnine earned his third Primetime Emmy Award nomination at age 92 for his work on the 2009 series finale of ER. He was known as the original voice of Mermaid Man on SpongeBob SquarePants from 1999 until his death in 2012. He replaced the late Vic Tayback as the voice of the villainous Carface Caruthers in both All Dogs Go to Heaven 2 (1996) and All Dogs Go to Heaven: The Series (1996–1998).

Early life
Borgnine was born Ermes Effron Borgnino on January 24, 1917, in Hamden, Connecticut, the son of Italian immigrants. His mother, Anna (1894– 1949), hailed from Carpi, near Modena, while his father Camillo Borgnino (1891–1975) was a native of Ottiglio near Alessandria. Borgnine's parents separated when he was two years old, and he then lived with his mother in Italy for about four and a half years. By 1923, his parents had reconciled, the family name was changed from Borgnino to Borgnine, and his father changed his first name to Charles. Borgnine had a younger sister, Evelyn Borgnine Velardi (1925–2013). The family settled in New Haven, Connecticut, where Borgnine graduated from James Hillhouse High School. He took to sports while growing up, but showed no interest in acting.

Naval service

Borgnine joined the United States Navy in October 1935, after graduation from high school. He served aboard the destroyer/minesweeper  and was honorably discharged from the Navy in October 1941. In January 1942, he reenlisted in the Navy after the attack on Pearl Harbor. During World War II, he patrolled the Atlantic Coast on an antisubmarine warfare ship, the patrol yacht . In September 1945, he was once again honorably discharged from the Navy. He served a total of almost 10 years in the Navy and obtained the grade of gunner's mate first class. His military awards include the Navy Good Conduct Medal, American Defense Service Medal with Fleet Clasp, American Campaign Medal with " bronze star, and the World War II Victory Medal.

In 1997, Borgnine received the United States Navy Memorial, Lone Sailor Award.

On December 7, 2000, Borgnine was named the Veterans Foundation's Veteran of the Year.

In October 2004, Borgnine received the honorary title of chief petty officer from Master Chief Petty Officer of the Navy Terry D. Scott. The ceremony for Borgnine's naval advancement was held at the U.S. Navy Memorial in Washington, DC. He received the special honor for his naval service and support of  naval personnel and their families worldwide.

In 2007, he received the California Commendation Medal.

Acting career

Early career
Borgnine returned to his parents' house in Connecticut after his Navy discharge without a job to go back to and no direction. In a British Film Institute interview about his life and career, he said:

He took a local factory job, but was unwilling to settle down to that kind of work. His mother encouraged him to pursue a more glamorous profession, and suggested to him that his personality would be well suited for the stage. He surprised his mother by taking the suggestion to heart, although his father was far from enthusiastic. In 2011, Borgnine remembered,

Stage
He studied acting at the Randall School of Drama in Hartford, then moved to Virginia, where he became a member of the Barter Theatre in Abingdon, Virginia. It had been named for the director's allowing audiences to barter produce for admission during the cash-lean years of the Great Depression. In 1947, Borgnine landed his first stage role in State of the Union. Although it was a short role, he won over the audience. His next role was as the Gentleman Caller in Tennessee Williams' The Glass Menagerie.

In 1949, Borgnine went to New York, where he had his Broadway debut in the role of a nurse in the play Harvey.

Films

An appearance as the villain on TV's Captain Video led to Borgnine's casting in the motion picture The Whistle at Eaton Falls (1951) for Columbia Pictures.  That year, Borgnine moved to Los Angeles, California, where he eventually received his big break in Columbia's From Here to Eternity (1953), playing the sadistic Sergeant "Fatso" Judson, who beats a stockade prisoner in his charge, Angelo Maggio (played by Frank Sinatra). Borgnine built a reputation as a dependable character actor, and played villains in early films, including movies such as Johnny Guitar, Vera Cruz, and Bad Day at Black Rock.

In 1955, the actor starred as a warmhearted butcher in Marty, the film version of the television play of the same title. He won the Academy Award for Best Actor over Frank Sinatra, James Dean (who had died by the time of the ceremony), and former Best Actor winners Spencer Tracy and James Cagney.

Borgnine's film career flourished for the next three decades, including roles in The Flight of the Phoenix (1965), The Dirty Dozen (1967) with Lee Marvin,  Ice Station Zebra (1968), The Poseidon Adventure (1972), Emperor of the North (1973), Convoy (1978), The Black Hole (1979), Super Fuzz (1980) and Escape from New York (1981).

One of his most famous roles was that of Dutch in the Western classic The Wild Bunch (1969) from director Sam Peckinpah. Of his role in The Wild Bunch, Borgnine later said,

Television and later works
Borgnine made his TV debut as a character actor in Captain Video and His Video Rangers, beginning in 1951. These two episodes led to countless other television roles that Borgnine would gain in Goodyear Television Playhouse, The Ford Television Theatre, Fireside Theatre, Frontier Justice, Laramie, Bob Hope Presents the Chrysler Theatre, Run for Your Life, Little House on the Prairie (a two-part episode entitled "The Lord is My Shepherd"), The Love Boat, Magnum, P.I., Highway to Heaven, Murder, She Wrote, Walker, Texas Ranger, Home Improvement, Touched by an Angel, the final episodes of ER, the first episode of Wagon Train, and many others.

McHale's Navy

In 1962, Borgnine signed a contract with Universal Studios for the lead role as the gruff but lovable skipper, Quinton McHale, in what began as a serious one-hour 1962 episode called "Seven Against the Sea" for Alcoa Premiere, and later reworked to a comedy called McHale's Navy, a World War II sitcom, which also co-starred unfamiliar comedians Joe Flynn as Capt. Wally Binghamton and Tim Conway as Ens. Charles Parker. The insubordinate crew of PT-73 helped the show become an overnight success during its first season, landing in the top 30 in 1963.

He thrived on the adulation from fans for their favorite navy man, and in 1963 received an Emmy nomination for Outstanding Lead Actor in a Comedy Series. At the end of the fourth season, in 1966, low ratings and repetitive storylines brought McHale's Navy to an end.

At the time McHale's Navy began production, Borgnine was married to actress Katy Jurado. Her death in 2002 drew Borgnine and Conway much closer, as Conway had heard so much of the actress's death. He knew that Borgnine had once referred to her as "beautiful, but a tiger." Conway thought Borgnine was more than likely to have died an Italian count, had it not been for Benito Mussolini: "I can't envision him as a count. But maybe as a king—certainly not a count." The last thing he said about his acting mentor's long career: "There were no limits to Ernie. When you look at his career—Fatso Judson to Marty, that's about as varied as you get in characters and he handled both of them with equal delicacy and got the most out of those characters."

1983 to 1998: Airwolf and subsequent roles

Borgnine returned to Universal Studios in 1983, for a co-starring role opposite Jan-Michael Vincent, on Airwolf. After he was approached by producer Donald P. Bellisario, who had been impressed by Borgnine's guest role as a wrestler in a 1982 episode of Magnum, P.I., he immediately agreed. He played Dominic Santini, a helicopter pilot, in the series, which became an immediate hit. Borgnine's strong performances belied his exhaustion due to the grueling production schedule, and the challenges of working with his younger, troubled series lead. The show was cancelled by CBS in 1986.

He appeared with Jonathan Silverman in The Single Guy as doorman Manny Cordoba, which lasted two seasons. According to Silverman, Borgnine came to work with more energy and passion than all other stars combined. He was the first person to arrive on the set every day and the last to leave.

In 1989, Borgnine went to Namibia to shoot the film Laser Mission, starring Brandon Lee. It was released in 1990.

In 1996, Borgnine starred in the televised fantasy/thriller film Merlin's Shop of Mystical Wonders (partially adapted from the 1984 horror film The Devil's Gift). As narrator and storyteller, Borgnine recounts a string of related supernatural tales, his modern-day fables notably centering on an enchanted and malicious cymbal-banging monkey toy stolen from the wizard Merlin. The film was later featured in the parodical television series Mystery Science Theater 3000, and has since gained a prominent cult following. Also in 1996, Borgnine toured the United States on a bus to meet his fans and see the country. The trip was the subject of a 1997 documentary, Ernest Borgnine on the Bus. He also served one year as the chairman of the National Salute to Hospitalized Veterans, visiting patients in many Department of Veterans Affairs medical centers.

In 1997, Borgnine appeared in the big-screen adaptation comedy film McHale's Navy, where he played Rear Admiral Quinton McHale, who was also the father of Tom Arnold's character, Quinton McHale, Jr.

In 1998, Borgnine appeared in the Trey Parker and Matt Stone comedy BASEketball as entrepreneur Ted Denslow.

1999 to 2011: Final works
Starting in 1999, Borgnine provided his voice talent to the animated sitcom SpongeBob SquarePants as the elderly superhero Mermaid Man (where he was paired up with his McHale's Navy co-star Tim Conway as the voice of Mermaid Man's sidekick Barnacle Boy). He expressed affection for this role, in no small part for its popularity among children. After his death, Nickelodeon reaired all of the episodes in which Mermaid Man appeared, in memoriam. Borgnine also appeared as himself in The Simpsons episode "Boy-Scoutz 'n the Hood", in addition to a number of television commercials. In 2000, he was the executive producer of Hoover, in which he was the only credited actor.

In 2007, Borgnine starred in the Hallmark original film A Grandpa for Christmas. He played a man who, after his estranged daughter ends up in the hospital because of a car accident, discovers that he has a granddaughter he never knew about. She is taken into his care, and they soon become great friends. Borgnine received a Golden Globe nomination for Best Actor in a Miniseries or Motion Picture made for Television for his performance. At 90, he was the oldest Golden Globe nominee ever. In 2010  he costarred in The Wishing Well.

Borgnine's autobiography Ernie was published by Citadel Press in July 2008. Ernie is a loose, conversational recollection of highlights from his acting career and notable events from his personal life.

On April 2, 2009, he appeared in several episodes of the final season of the long-running medical series ER. His role was that of a husband dealing with the decline of his wife, who would die in the final episode of the series. In his final scene, his character is in a hospital bed lying beside his just-deceased wife. His performance garnered an Emmy nomination for Outstanding Guest Actor in a Drama Series, his third nomination and his first in 29 years (since being nominated for Outstanding Supporting Actor in a Limited Series or a Special in 1980 for All Quiet on the Western Front).

In 2009, at age 92, he starred as Frank, the main character of Another Harvest Moon, directed by Greg Swartz and also starring Piper Laurie and Anne Meara. On October 2, 2010, Borgnine appeared as himself in a sketch with Morgan Freeman on Saturday Night Live. On October 15, 2010, he appeared in Red, which was filmed earlier that year. In late 2011, Borgnine completed what was his last film, playing Rex Page in The Man Who Shook the Hand of Vicente Fernandez.

Personal life

Borgnine married five times. His first marriage, from 1949 to 1958, was to Rhoda Kemins, whom he met while serving in the Navy. They had one daughter, Nancee (born May 28, 1952). He was then married to actress Katy Jurado from 1959 to 1963. Borgnine's marriage to singer Ethel Merman in 1964 lasted only 42 days. Their time together was mostly spent hurling profane insults at each other, and both  later admitted that the marriage was a colossal mistake (Merman's description of the marriage in her autobiography was a solitary blank page). Their divorce was finalized on May 25, 1965.

From 1965 to 1972, Borgnine was married to Donna Rancourt, with whom he had a son, Cristopher (born August 9, 1969) and two daughters, Sharon (born August 5, 1965) and Diana (born December 29, 1970). His fifth and last marriage was to Tova Traesnaes, which lasted from February 24, 1973, until his death in July 2012.

In 2000, Borgnine received his 50-year pin as a Freemason at Abingdon Lodge No. 48 in Abingdon, Virginia. He joined the Scottish Rite Valley of Los Angeles in 1964, received the Knights Commander of the Court of Honor (KCCH) in 1979, was crowned a 33° Inspector General Honorary in 1983, and received the Grand Cross of the Court of Honour in 1991.

According to a friend of Tim Conway, who talked about their time shooting McHale's Navy: "You know, we were all guys, it was about the war, and about men, so, there weren't many women working on the show, so we can spit, talk, swear, and everything—smoke? Gosh. So, it was male oriented." Conway once referred to Borgnine making new friends off of the Universal set, "It was the beginning of the trams, going through Universal. Ernie was probably one of the few people at Universal, who would stop the trams and say, 'Hello, how are you?' He would talk to everybody at the tram." While the show McHale's Navy was going strong, Tim had also said of Borgnine's short-lived marriage to Ethel Merman, "Ernie is volatile. I mean, there's no question about that; and Ethel was a very strong lady. So, you put two bombs in a room, something is going to explode, and I guess it probably did." He also said about the cancellation of McHale's Navy was, "We had gone from the South Pacific to Italy, and then, once in a while, we got to New York or something. The storylines were beginning to duplicate themselves. So, they actually said, 'Maybe, they had its run!. Conway kept in touch with Borgnine for more than 40 years, while living not too far from one another. In 1999, the duo reunited to lend their voices to several episodes of SpongeBob SquarePants.

Borgnine was a heavy smoker until 1962.

Death
Borgnine died of kidney failure on July 8, 2012, at Cedars-Sinai Medical Center in Los Angeles. He was 95 years old. Borgnine was cremated. A bench dedicated to his memory was later installed at Forest Lawn Cemetery.

Honors

Borgnine's hometown of Hamden, Connecticut, where he enjoyed a large and vocal following, named a park and a small road in his honor. From 1972 to 2002, Borgnine marched in Milwaukee's annual Great Circus Parade as the "Grand Clown".

In 1994, Borgnine received the Ellis Island Medal of Honor from the National Ethnic Coalition of Organizations.

In 1996, he was inducted into the Western Performers Hall of Fame at the National Cowboy & Western Heritage Museum in Oklahoma City.

In 1997, Borgnine was the commencement speaker at Lakeland College, and received an honorary doctorate in humane letters in recognition of his distinguished acting career.

In 1998, the Palm Springs, California, Walk of Stars dedicated a Golden Palm Star to him.

In 2006, the comune of Ottiglio, Italy, his father's birthplace, gave him honorary citizenship.

The SpongeBob Movie: Sponge Out of Water (2015) is dedicated to Borgnine.

Film awards and nominations
Borgnine won the 1955 Academy Award for Best Actor for his portrayal of Marty Piletti in the film Marty. At the time of his death, he was the oldest living recipient of the Best Actor Oscar.

For his contributions to the film industry, Borgnine received a motion pictures star on the Hollywood Walk of Fame in 1960. The star is located at 6324 Hollywood Boulevard.

He was honored with the Screen Actors Guild Life Achievement Award at the 17th Screen Actors Guild Awards, held January 30, 2011.

Awards from fraternal groups
In 2000, Borgnine received his 50-year pin as a Freemason in Abingdon Lodge No. 48, Abingdon, Virginia. He joined the Scottish Rite Valley of Los Angeles (in the Southern Jurisdiction of the U.S.A) in 1964, received the KCCH in 1979, was crowned a 33° Inspector General Honorary in 1983, and received the Grand Cross of the Court of Honour in 1991. He was also a member of the Loyal Order of Moose at that organization's Lodge in Junction City, Oregon. He volunteered to be Stories of Service National spokesman, urging his fellow World War II vets to come forward and share their stories.

Filmography

Film

Television

Video games

References

Further reading
 
 Wise, James. Stars in Blue: Movie Actors in America's Sea Services. Annapolis, MD: Naval Institute Press, 1997.  . .

External links

 
 
 
 
 
 

1917 births
2012 deaths
20th-century American male actors
21st-century American male actors
American male film actors
American male stage actors
American male television actors
American male voice actors
American people of Italian descent
Best Actor Academy Award winners
Best Drama Actor Golden Globe (film) winners
Best Foreign Actor BAFTA Award winners
California Republicans
Connecticut Republicans
Deaths from kidney failure
Male Western (genre) film actors
Male actors from Connecticut
Male actors from Los Angeles
Military personnel from Connecticut
People from Hamden, Connecticut
United States Navy personnel of World War II
United States Navy sailors
American Freemasons